was a professional boxer from Tokyo, Japan. He won the world flyweight title in 1952, becoming the first Japanese boxer to win a world title.

Childhood and early career 
Shirai first boxed in elementary school, during a mock match-up against a kangaroo at a local carnival. He became interested in boxing afterwards, and made his professional debut in 1943, during World War II. He won his first eight professional fights before being drafted to join the Imperial Japanese Navy. After being released in 1945, he returned to boxing, but was almost forced into retirement because of injuries he had sustained during the war. However, he met Alvin Rober Cahn, a Jewish-American SCAP employee, who became his trainer and manager. Shirai's boxing skills improved dramatically under Cahn's guidance, and the two formed a close bond.

Shirai fought with the aggressive boxing style typical of the Japanese boxers of the time, but made a change to a more technical, defensive style under the guidance of his new trainer. Cahn made Shirai live in his house, and supervised everything from his health and training to his meals. Cahn began to suffer from dementia in his old age, and it was Shirai's family that took care of him. Cahn had no children when he died, and left Shirai with his entire fortune.

Professional career 
Shirai won his first fight after teaming with Cahn on July 30, 1948, and won the Japanese flyweight title in 1949. He also won the Japanese bantamweight title the same year, and held both titles for over 3 years, making 5 total defenses.

He fought flyweight world champion Dado Marino on May 21, 1951, in a non-title match. Shirai lost by split decision but fought Marino again in December, 1951, to mark a 7th round KO win. On May 19, 1952, he met Marino for the third time for the world flyweight title. Shirai won by 15 round decision, becoming the new world champion, and first ever Japanese boxer to win a world title.

Shirai made four defenses of the world title before losing his title to Pascual Perez in November, 1954 by unanimous decision. He fought Perez again in May, 1955, but lost decisively by KO in the 5th round. He announced his retirement after this loss. His professional record was 48-8-2 (20KOs).

Post retirement 
Shirai worked as a boxing commentator and critic before creating a sports gym in 1995 with former world champion Yoko Gushiken. He received an award from the Japanese government in 1995 for his efforts in boxing. He was inducted into the Ring Magazine hall of fame in 1977.

Death 
Shirai died from pneumonia on December 26, 2003. He was 80 years old.

Professional boxing record

See also 
 List of flyweight boxing champions
 List of WBA world champions
 List of The Ring world champions
 List of Japanese boxing world champions
 Boxing in Japan

References

External links 
 
 Yoshio Shirai - CBZ Profile

|-

|-

|-

|-

1923 births
2003 deaths
Flyweight boxers
People from Tokyo
World Boxing Association champions
The Ring (magazine) champions
World flyweight boxing champions
World boxing champions
Boxing commentators
Japanese male boxers
Imperial Japanese Navy personnel of World War II